The 1960 Los Angeles Chargers season was the team's inaugural season and also the inaugural season of the American Football League (AFL). Head coach Sid Gillman led the Chargers to the AFL Western Division title with a 10–4 record, winning eight games out of nine after a 2–3 start, and qualifying to play the Houston Oilers in the AFL championship game.

The Chargers had the right to host the championship game at their home venue, the Los Angeles Memorial Coliseum. However, as the team's attendance for home games was falling below 10,000, league and television officials feared showing empty seats in the 100,000+ seat Coliseum, and they persuaded the Chargers to give up the advantage. The game was moved to Houston's Jeppesen Stadium. The teams had split their two games in the regular season, with the home teams winning, and the host Oilers were 6½-point favorites to win the title. Down by a point after three quarters, the Chargers gave up an 88-yard touchdown in the fourth quarter and lost, 24–16.

The Chargers' poor attendance figures, due in part to heavy competition from the Los Angeles Rams, soon led to speculation that they might leave Los Angeles. In December, owner Barron Hilton denied that he was planning a move, but in late January he relocated the Chargers down the coast to Balboa Stadium in San Diego for the 1961 season. The team would not return to Los Angeles until 2017 where they would temporarily stay at Dignity Health Sports Park in the suburb of Carson for three seasons until they moved to Sofi Stadium in Inglewood with the Rams in 2020.

Offseason

Formation 

The AFL granted a Los Angeles franchise to Barron Hilton on August 14, 1959; the nickname "Chargers" was announced on October 27. Hilton's first major signing was former Notre Dame coach and administrator Frank Leahy, who became the club's first general manager on October 14 and began the search for a head coach. Leahy also employed Don Klosterman as Director of Personnel, to help sign new players.

Coaching staff 

Bob McBride, a former assistant of Leahy's at Notre Dame, was named the first Chargers head coach on November 19, but McBride changed his mind within 24 hours of the announcement and pulled out. Subsequently, Leahy had several talks with Los Angeles Rams offensive line coach Lou Rymkus about the vacancy, but Rymkus ultimately joined another AFL team, the Houston Oilers.

On December 12, Sid Gillman left the NFL's Los Angeles Rams after five years as their head coach. The Rams had reached the NFL Championship Game in Gillman's first season in charge, but went 2-10 in 1959. After his exit, Gillman considered retiring from football to become a stockbroker, but was soon lured to the AFL when approached by Hilton, signing a three-year contract on January 7, 1960, having been out of work for just 26 days.

Gillman recruited four assistant coaches in the months that followed. Both Joe Madro and Jack Faulkner had been on Gillman's staff with the Rams; they were installed as offensive line and defensive backfield coaches, respectively. Al Davis was serving as the defensive coordinator at the University of Southern California when Gillman called to offer him a post of his choosing. Davis agreed, taking over the offensive ends, as he wanted to be involved with the passing game. The group was completed on February 1 by the addition of Chuck Noll as defensive line coach. Noll had recently concluded a seven-year career with the Cleveland Browns where he had served as both offensive lineman and linebacker. Three of the coaches on this five-man team are now in the Hall of Fame: Gillman, Davis and Noll.

In July 1960, Leahy resigned as general manager due to ill health, and Gillman took over the role on top of his head coaching duties.

AFL draft

First selections 

The AFL owners met on November 22-23, 1959, for the opening stages of the league's inaugural draft. On the first day, a "territorial draft" was conducted, with each team receiving the rights to one local player. This was intended to increase interest in the new teams. Each player in the territorial draft was agreed upon by all eight owners; the Chargers received Monty Stickles, but the Notre Dame end ultimately signed with the NFL's San Francisco 49ers instead.

The following day, thirty-two more rounds took place, with the intent of giving each team three players in each offensive position. The selections are believed to have been decided by a drawing of lots, though the closed-door nature of the meeting leaves the precise details of the process unknown. A contemporary source lists 11 players as "Charger Choices" and a further 22 as "additional selections".

The rival NFL staged their own draft one week later, beginning a bidding war for the services of players. Including Stickles, eight of the Chargers' initial thirty-three selections played for NFL teams in 1960. Only three were with the Chargers on opening day. Linebacker and punter Paul Maguire, who had played for Al Davis at The Citadel in 1956, agreed to an $8,000 contract with a $1,000 bonus on Christmas Day, while Wisconsin safety Bob Zeman signed on January 12, 1960, following a meeting with Gillman. The acquisition of Charlie Flowers was less straightforward. Flowers signed a contract with the New York Giants but asked them to keep the agreement secret until after the 1960 Sugar Bowl, to maintain his eligibility for the game. Flowers then changed his mind and signed with the Chargers after they offered him more money. The Giants obtained an injunction to temporarily block the fullback from joining his chosen team, but the courts ruled in San Diego's favor on June 23.

As the precise order of selection is unknown, the Chargers' draft is presented here in alphabetical order. The players were listed according to their offensive positions, even if they were primarily defensive players.

Second selections 

The AFL owners reconvened on December 2, 1959, for a further 20 rounds of picks. The league released no details as to the order of these selections, but the randomized method is believed to have been used again.

None of Los Angeles' 20 selections played for the team in 1960, but George Blair would join them in 1961, after playing for the University of Mississippi in his senior year.

Roster building 

AFL teams were permitted a squad of 35 players going into the opening week of the regular season. The Chargers stocked their initial roster with numerous rookies, along with a smattering of former NFL players.

One of their most successful acquisitions, Ron Mix, had been drafted by the Boston Patriots, but Los Angeles traded for his rights and beat the NFL's Baltimore Colts to his signature. Mix officially became a Charger on December 16, ten days before his last game for USC. He would become the only man to play for the Chargers in all ten AFL seasons, while being named All-AFL at right tackle every year from 1960 to 1968.

Jack Kemp had been cut by three different NFL teams before signing for the Chargers. When Kemp was signed by the Chargers, he was also offered a job with the Hilton hotel chain to improve his job prospects after his playing career ended. Kemp was soon identified as the leading candidate for the starting quarterback role. He would lead the Chargers to the first two AFL title games, and win a further two with the Buffalo Bills.

Once Al Davis had joined Gillman's coaching team, he became instrumental in persuading several players to join the Chargers. Center Don Rogers had been a late cut of the San Francisco 49ers in 1959. He returned to college at South Carolina, and told Davis he had no further interest in playing pro football. Davis persisted with several telephone calls, and gave Rogers $500 to sign a contract, despite Rogers making it clear he had no intention of reporting to training camp. Rogers eventually drove out to Los Angeles to see California, with little expectation of making the team, but won the starting job and stayed with the Chargers for five years. Others signed by Davis included guards Fred Cole and Sam DeLuca. Like Rogers, running back Paul Lowe had been released by the 49ers in 1959. He took a job with the Carte Blanche credit card organization, owned by the Hilton family. The Chargers management discovered that Lowe was working in the mail room and contacted him about playing for them. Lowe won a spot on the team, and stayed with the Chargers until 1968, rushing for nearly 5,000 yards.

In some cases, the Chargers signed key players away from the NFL by offering more money. Tackle Ernie Wright was offered a guaranteed $33,000 over three years; having heard that fellow Ohio State graduate Jim Parker was making less than $8,000 per year with the Baltimore Colts, he considered the offer too good to pass up. Wright would start over 100 games at left tackle for the Chargers.

Some veteran players actively sought out employment in Los Angeles. End Dave Kocourek and defensive end Ron Nery both wanted to return to the U.S. after stints in the Canadian Football League. They contacted the Chargers and were invited to training camp. For less experienced players, open trials were held by Gillman's staff in April. A handful of these hopefuls made it to training camp proper, which began on July 8 at Chapman College in Orange, California. Players came to the camp in three waves, with higher-rated prospects coming in later, and were steadily whittled down to the target of 35 players.

Personnel

Staff

Roster

Preseason 

The Chargers' first exhibition game was played at home against the Titans, before a crowd of 27,778. Paul Lowe received the opening kickoff, and returned it 105 yards for a touchdown. Jack Kemp rushed for one touchdown and passed for another to Royce Womble, before Bob Laraba wrapped up a 27–7 win with a short run. Five days later, Los Angeles played before a greatly reduced home crowd of 11,491. Howie Ferguson's late touchdown run represented the only points scored by a Charger who would make their regular season roster. Jetstream Smith scored on a 30-yard run, while Bob Reifsnyder contributed three field goals and an extra point; they would spend the 1960 season with the Raiders and Titans, respectively. In Week 3, Los Angeles made the short trip to Oakland, where they faced the Raiders. Lowe caught a 43-yard pass from Kemp for his second preseason score, and a pair of Ferguson touchdown runs in the third quarter put the Chargers ahead to stay, 24–17.

After engaging in a controlled scrimmage against the Eagle Rock Athletic Club on August 26, Los Angeles concluded their exhibition schedule at home against Denver, before an attendance of 21,516. Lowe scored one of three Charger touchdowns in the first half, and Bob Zeman's 47-yard interception return had them up by five in the third quarter. Nonetheless, they trailed 30–28 before two late takeaways. Paul Maguire's interception with barely a minute to play offered Los Angeles their first shot at victory, but Ben Donnell missed a 30-yard field goal. Though only seconds remained, Denver had to keep running regular plays, as the quarterback kneel was not yet an established part of the game. Two plays after Donnell's miss, a loose snap was fallen on in the end zone by Charlie Brueckman, winning the game with 14 seconds to play.

Donnell's struggles prompted the Chargers to approach kicking specialist Ben Agajanian, a veteran of both the NFL and AAFC, who signed for them just three days before their regular season opener.

Regular season

Overview 

Quarterback Jack Kemp had struggled to make an impact in the established NFL, but proved a success in the AFL, ranking first in the league with 14.3 yards per completion, and a close second with 3,018 passing yards. He also rushed for eight touchdowns, tied with Paul Lowe for second most in the league. Lowe was used mainly as a kick returner during the first five weeks of the season, but broke out as a runner through the remaining nine, when he gained 817 of his 855 yards. With a further 377 receiving yards, he ranked fourth in the league in total scrimmage yards, and led the team with ten touchdowns rushing and receiving. Fullback Howie Ferguson, a veteran of six seasons in Green Bay, added 438 yards and four touchdowns on the ground, while scoring twice more with receptions. Ralph Anderson led the receiving corps in all categories through the first ten games, with 44 receptions for 614 yards and five touchdowns. He died from complications of diabetes on the eve of the next game, at the age of 24. Dave Kocourek finished with 40 catches for 662 yards and a touchdown.

On defense, the Chargers ranked second of the eight AFL teams against the pass, third against the rush and third overall. Rookie Dick Harris led the team with five interceptions, and ran one of those back for a touchdown. Defensive end Ron Nery was unofficially credited with a team-high  quarterback sacks, while defensive tackle Dick Chorovich had 4. The most experienced Charger was kicker Ben Agajanian, whose career had begun in 1945. He was one of only two AFL kickers to make more than half of their field goal attempts, with 13 successes out of 24, while his 46 extra points from 47 tries tied George Blanda for league-best.

Schedule

Game summaries 

All game reports use the Pro Football Researchers' gamebook archive as a source.

Week 1: vs. Dallas Texans 

Los Angeles won their first regular season game with a late comeback. Dallas had touchdown drives of 60 and 94 yards either side of a Charger punt, and led 13–0 midway through the 2nd quarter. Later, Dallas had to punt from deep in their own territory, and Los Angeles took over on the Texan 46. They scored their first touchdown on the next play as Jack Kemp faked a handoff and threw a deep pass down the left sideline. Ralph Anderson caught the ball at the five and back-pedaled into the end zone. Dallas responded with an 80-yard touchdown drive, and led 20–7 at the break.

In the 3rd quarter, Los Angeles reached the Dallas eight yard line, but Kemp was sacked on 4th down and goal. They appeared to have been stopped on downs again in the 4th quarter, but Anderson had drawn a pass interference penalty, and the drive continued. Running back Paul Lowe completed a 24-yard pass to Anderson, then Kemp scrambled in from the Dallas 7 yard line, diving across the goal line with 9:38 to play.

Following a Texan three-and-out, the Chargers began the winning drive on their own 10. Penalties were again key. Dallas recovered a fumble in Charger territory, but the turnover was negated by a flag. Kemp then converted a 3rd and 15 with a 16-yard completion to Howard Clark, before Los Angeles reached a 4th and 6 from the Dallas 37 yard line. Again, Kemp's pass was incomplete, but again a pass interference call (this time drawn by Dave Kocourek) saved the drive. Five plays later, it was 3rd and goal from the four yard line, and Kemp found Howie Ferguson in the left flat for the winning score with 2:15 to play. Jimmy Sears stopped Dallas with a 4th-down interception, and the Chargers ran out the clock.

Kemp was 24 of 41 for 275 yards, two touchdowns and no interceptions. Anderson caught 5 passes for 103 yards and a touchdown; Lowe was the leading Charger rusher with just 20 yards.

Week 2: at Houston Oilers 

A bad start to the 3rd quarter led to defeat for the Chargers in their first road game. Kemp found Royce Womble for a touchdown on their first drive and, following a burst of three touchdowns on three consecutive possessions for the Oilers, connected with Anderson on a short out pattern to close to 21–14 at the break. After Houston opened the second half with a 71-yard touchdown drive, Ron Waller lost a fumble on the Chargers' next play from scrimmage, setting up a field goal. On the ensuing kickoff, Lowe also fumbled, with Houston converting the turnover into a touchdown and a 38–14 lead. Kemp threw touchdowns to Womble and Charlie Flowers in the 4th quarter, the latter a catch-and-run of 55 yards, but the scores came too late to seriously threaten a comeback.

Kemp achieved the first 300-yard passing game in the fledgling AFL, going 27 of 44 for 337 yards, four touchdowns and an interception. For the second consecutive game, Los Angeles' top rusher gained 20 yards; as a team, they were outrushed 284-28.

Week 3: at Dallas Texans 

Kemp struggled, throwing four interceptions against only 89 passing yards as the Chargers were shut out. Los Angeles had a couple of good openings while the game was still scoreless: they reached the Dallas 29, only for Kemp to be sacked for a 16-yard loss, and Ben Agajanian to see a long field goal attempt blocked; later, Los Angeles drove from their own 20 to the Dallas 22, but Flowers lost a fumble. Kemp fumbled on the next Charger drive, setting up the first Texan touchdown. Agajanian missed two kicks in the 3rd quarter, and Dallas added ten points in the 4th to clinch the win.

Los Angeles committed six of the game's nine turnovers. The running game improved, with Howie Ferguson gaining 93 yards on 17 carries.

Week 4: at Buffalo Bills 

Four interceptions by their defense allowed Los Angeles to win despite 159 yards of total offense. Ferguson fumbled away their first big scoring opportunity, and Buffalo took the lead with a field goal. Before halftime, however, Paul Maguire claimed the first Charger interception, a 37-yard pass interference penalty moved the ball to the 11, and Bobby Clatterbuck, playing for an injured Kemp, threw to Dave Kocourek on a crossing pattern for the go-ahead score.

Maguire's second interception set up a 30-yard touchdown drive in the third quarter, Ferguson diving over the line from two yards out. The Bills pulled back to within four points, but a Dick Harris interception gave Los Angeles even better field position, at the Bills 13. Flowers rushed for a touchdown two plays later. Shortly afterwards, Jimmy Sears intercepted a pass and returned it 47 yards to set up a field goal; the final Bills threat was ended by a sack on 4th and goal from the nine.

Week 5: vs. Boston Patriots 

The Chargers suffered their second shutout in three weeks, this time before their home fans. Courtesy of a fumbled kickoff, the Chargers trailed 11–0 before their offense got onto the field. With Boston's rushing attack churning out 177 yards on 45 carries, the game soon drifted away from Los Angeles. The Chargers tried bringing Kemp back in the second half, only to see him throw two interceptions. Their best chance to avert the shutout came in the 4th quarter, when Ferguson fumbled a yard from the goal line.

Week 6: at Denver Broncos 

Paul Lowe had a breakout performance to lift the Chargers to an important win. Denver, topping the division with a 3–1 record coming in, led through an early field goal before Kemp passed to Lowe for 56 yards down the right sideline. On the next play, Lowe swept left for a 12-yard touchdown. A succession of field goals, the last a club-record 47-yarder by Agajanian, made it 16–9 to Los Angeles late in the third quarter. From the Denver 44, Lowe then took a handoff around left end before cutting back inside at the 15, breaking a tackle and completing his second touchdown run of the game.

The Broncos pulled three points back before both sides missed chances. Rommie Loudd intercepted Frank Tripucka to set the Chargers up at the Bronco 13, but Kemp fumbled three plays later. Denver then drove all the way from their 5 yard line to the Charger 8 before turning the ball over on downs. Given an opportunity to put the game away, Los Angeles instead gave the ball straight back through a Ferguson fumble. Denver scored two plays later; they shunned a two-point conversion attempt and trailed 23-19 with only 3:35 to play. Kemp converted a 3rd down with a completion to Kocourek, and Lowe had a 50-yard touchdown run ruled out by penalty before the Chargers had to punt in the final seconds. The Bronco return man was tackled at his own 23 yard line as time expired.

Lowe, who had gained only 38 yards on the ground and 35 through the air through the first five weeks of the season, rushed 11 times for 76 yards and two touchdowns, while catching 4 passes for 95 yards.

Week 8: at Boston Patriots 

Three weeks after their 35-point loss to Boston, the Chargers beat the same opponent by a similar margin; the win moved them into a tie atop the AFL West. Kemp was intercepted on the first Charger drive, but Maury Schleicher recovered a fumble deep in Patriot territory a few possessions later, and Ferguson opened the scoring from a yard out. Kemp later dove over from the same distance, one play after a 27-yard completion to Anderson; Dick Harris soon added a defensive touchdown, going 42 yards untouched down the sideline with an interception. Thirty seconds before halftime, Lowe exploited a hole in the line of scrimmage to go 66 yards untouched for the fourth Charger score and, when Paul Maguire recovered a blocked punt early in the 4th quarter, Los Angeles had matched the 35–0 score from the first game. Boston recovered somewhat with a pair of touchdowns, but Lowe broke off a 69-yard run to set up a field goal, and Anderson added a 38-yard touchdown reception before the end.

Lowe posted the first 100-yard rushing game in Charger history, with 8 carries for 137 yards and a touchdown, and Los Angeles outrushed Boston 219–46. Anderson caught 6 passes for 124 yards and a touchdown.

Week 9: at New York Titans 

Big plays helped the Chargers get to the top of their division. After surviving a 1st quarter in which Ron Botchan twice snapped the ball over punter Paul Maguire's head, Kemp threw a deep pass on 3rd and 15 from his own 47 yard line and the ball deflected off the hands of a Titans' defender and Kocourek brought it in for a 52-yard gain. Ferguson reached the end zone from a yard out on the next play. Botchan later made amends for his miscues with an interception at his own 30, and it was 7–0 at the break.

Early in the 3rd quarter, the Charger line created open lanes for Lowe to run right through the middle; he outraced the defense and scored from 62 yards out, untouched. Jets QB Al Dorow threw a touchdown to pull the Titans back within seven points, but later fumbled, with Charlie Brueckman recovering at the New York 21. Kemp bootlegged for 17 yards, then went over from the one yard line on the first play of the 4th quarter. The Titans' best chance to get back into the game ended when Doyle Nix intercepted Dorow in the red zone - one of six takeaways for the Charger defense on the day.

Week 10: vs. Houston Oilers 

Los Angeles intercepted George Blanda four times as they edged the East-leading Oilers. Houston's first three possessions resulted in turnovers, and two of those were converted into points, Anderson catching touchdown passes of 34 and 4 yards. The roles were reversed in the 2nd quarter, as a long bomb from Kemp was intercepted, and Blanda led his team 93 yards the other way for a touchdown. Lowe inspired an immediate response from the Chargers, breaking off a 40-yard run up the right sideline and going in from three yards out a play later. Houston came back with a 68-yard touchdown drive, and it was 21–14 at halftime.

Agajanian missed a 27-yard field goal on the first drive of the second half, but catches of 32 and 11 yards by Kocourek put him in position for another try, and he converted a 22-yarder. The next two Houston drives penetrated into Los Angeles territory, but Blanda was intercepted both times, by Rommie Loudd and Bob Zeman. Blanda threw his third touchdown pass on the next Oiler possession, and Houston had a late chance after Kemp was intercepted. They reached the Charger 44, but two incompletions were followed by two fumbles. Los Angeles recovered the second of these, and ran out the clock.

Kemp was 18 of 37 for 296 yards, two touchdowns and two interceptions; Kocourek caught 7 passes for 105 yards.

Week 11: vs. Buffalo Bills 

The Chargers turned the ball over eight times as their four-game winning streak was brought to an end. The tone was set early, as Kocourek lost a fumble on their first possession, Kemp was intercepted on their second, and Sears fumbled a punt when they were expecting their third. Buffalo opened the scoring from that error; Agajanian then got Los Angeles on the scoreboard with a field goal, but the Bills drove 79 yards on 14 plays to an answering touchdown. Kemp threw five of the Chargers' six interceptions on the day. His struggles were epitomized by a sequence shortly before halftime, when he was sacked for a 24-yard loss on one play and had an interception run back for a touchdown on the next, putting the Bills up 19–3.

Ralph Anderson was one of the few bright spots for Los Angeles. He caught 7 passes for 109 yards in his final game.

Week 12: vs. Oakland Raiders 

This game was played the day after the death of Ralph Anderson. Los Angeles scored more than 50 points for the first time. Don Norton began the scoring with a 69-yard touchdown reception only 2:16 into the game. The Raiders tied the score, but Lowe took a screen pass 63 yards for another touchdown only two plays later. He took a pass 33 yards in the 2nd quarter, opening an 80-yard drive that Ferguson finished with a dive over the middle on 4th and goal from the one. Kemp took in a sneak from the same distance, and Lowe's 30-yard run gave Agajanian the opportunity to kick a 28-yard field goal as time expired in the half.

Lowe added a 2-yard touchdown run the first time Los Angeles had the ball in the second half, and it was 38–7. Oakland then pulled back 15 points, but the Chargers responded with touchdowns from Fred Ford (a 4-yard run) and Doyle Nix (a 17-yard interception return of an underthrown pass in the flat).

Kemp was 13 of 24 for 307 yards, two touchdowns and two interceptions, while Norton caught 4 passes for 119 yards and a touchdown. Lowe carried 26 times for 149 yards and a touchdown, while catching two passes for 96 yards and a further touchdown. Linebacker and punter Paul Maguire sustained a season-ending knee injury during the game.

Week 13: at Oakland Raiders 

Los Angeles again beat Oakland by a significant margin, though they had trailed before scoring four unanswered 4th quarter touchdowns. A 45-yard run by Lowe got the Chargers moving, late in a scoreless 1st quarter; a Royce Womble touchdown finished the drive. Oakland scored 14 unanswered points, then sacked Kemp and backed Los Angeles up to their own 18 yard line, where they faced a 3rd and 18. Kemp responded with three completions over the middle in a span of four plays: 27 yards to Kocourek; 34 to Norton; 21 and a touchdown to Norton. In the 3rd quarter, Oakland stopped Ferguson on 4th and goal from the one, before driving 82 yards the other way and edging in front with a field goal.

The momentum shifted early in the 4th quarter. On 2nd and 9 from the Oakland 49, Kemp rolled right under pressure before throwing back toward the middle of the field. Lowe caught the ball at the Raider 35, and evaded three diving tackles on his way to the end zone. As the quarter wore on, two fumble recoveries in Raider territory would set up a pair of Kemp rushing touchdown, before Babe Parilli lost the ball while being sacked; it bounced up for Loudd to recover and race 49 yards for a touchdown.

Kemp was 17 of 25 for 289 yards, three touchdowns and no interceptions. The Chargers had two 100-yard receivers for the first time, with Kocourek catching 6 for 123 yards, while Norton had 7 receptions for 105 yards and a touchdown. The Chargers committed no turnovers for the first time in their history, while the defense managed four takeaways. Dick Harris had both an interception and a fumble recovery.

Oakland protested the result of this game. Los Angeles had brought in Al Bansavage to replace the injured Paul Maguire, but the Raiders, who had held the rights to the player, claimed that Bansavage had refused to play for them, and thus was ineligible for any other team. The Chargers claimed in response that Oakland had told Bansavage they did not want him. On December 7, AFL commissioner Joe Foss ruled that the result would stand.

Week 14: vs. Denver Broncos 

Coming into the game, the Chargers were two games clear of Dallas at the top of the AFL West, and could clinch the division with a win. They did so after surviving a high-scoring, back-and-forth encounter.

Denver opened the scoring with a field goal, then Lionel Taylor, who would gain 171 yards on the day, caught a 49-yard touchdown from Frank Tripucka. It took Kemp only two plays to respond, passing to Norton for 32 yards, then to Ferguson with a jump pass. The back raced unchallenged up the right sideline for a 39-yard score. Next, Sears recovered a Denver fumble, Kemp scrambled for 25 yards, and Lowe scored from three yards out a couple of plays later. Following an exchange of punts, Denver drove 98 yards in 12 plays to retake the lead, and converted a Kemp interception into three more points. Lowe responded with back-to-back carries of 18 and 27 yards, before Kemp passed to Womble for 12 yards on a slant pattern to put the Chargers back in front. Los Angeles added an Agajanian field goal after a Denver fumble, the Broncos responded with a kick of their own, and it was 24–23 to the Chargers at halftime.

Tripucka's second touchdown pass put Denver back on top in the second half; following an exchange of field goals, Denver led 33–27 early in the final quarter. On the Broncos' next possession, a 20-yard punt set Los Angeles up only 35 yards from the end zone. Kemp picked up a couple of first downs with passes, converted a 3rd and 1 with a sneak, and dove in from a yard out for the go-ahead score. Tripucka was then forced to pass under pressure; the pass was tipped, and Maury Schleicher intercepted it. Norton's 15-yard touchdown three plays later made it an eight-point game, and Denver failed to cross midfield on their final two possessions.

Lowe carried 19 times for 106 yards and a touchdown. Despite the high stakes of this game, the Los Angeles attendance figures dropped below 10,000 for the first time. This would remain the lowest attendance for a competitive Charger home game until the COVID-19 pandemic necessitated empty stadiums in the 2020 season.

Week 15: vs. New York Titans 

Los Angeles closed out their regular season schedule by prevailing in another high-scoring game for an eighth win in nine. The Chargers' first touchdown came the play after Harris's 35-yard punt return, which put the ball at the New York 25. Lowe ran into traffic around right end, avoiding a heavy loss before reversing field to the left and going in untouched. A pair of long touchdown drives put New York up 14–10; Norton's 11-yard catch briefly restored the Charger lead, but Titans QB Al Dorow threw his second touchdown pass of the game, and it was 21–16 at halftime.

In the 3rd quarter, an Agajanian field goal was followed by Norton's second touchdown, from 31 yards. The final 3:13 of the quarter brought three further touchdowns: Dorow sneaked in follow a Kemp interception, Fred Ford broke of a 53-yard touchdown run around left end, and Dorow threw his third touchdown pass. When the Titans converted another interception into seven points, two minutes into the final quarter, they led 43–33. Kemp responded with a 29-yard completion to Kocourek on the next play from scrimmage, and found Blanche Martin for an 11-yard touchdown four plays later. Martin kept hold of the ball despite running into the goalposts. The Titans then went three-and-out, and Sears broke off a 29-yard punt return to the New York 48. Six plays later, Kemp swept to the right for the go-ahead touchdown. Charlie McNeil, who had intercepted Dorow once in the opening quarter, did so twice more in the final minutes; the Chargers kicked a field goal after the first of these, and ran out the clock after the second.

Kemp finished with 3 touchdowns against 4 interceptions. Ford rushed for 109 yards on 7 carries, the best game of his solitary year in professional football. Los Angeles scored 40+ points for the fourth consecutive game, an AFL/NFL record which stood unmatched until the St. Louis Rams repeated the feat in the 2000 season.

Standings

Playoffs

Game summary

AFL Championship Game: at Houston Oilers 

The first AFL title game matched two 10–4 divisional champions. Los Angeles scored field goals on their first two possessions of the game, with Lowe's 30-yard run on the second drive being the biggest play. The next time the Chargers had the ball, Kemp was intercepted in his own territory, but Blanda missed a 32-yard field goal wide right. Blanda, who doubled as a quarterback and kicker, did produce points on the next Oiler possession, capping an 83-yard drive with a 17-yard touchdown pass on 3rd and 10. Kemp was intercepted again five plays later, and Blanda led his team 40 yards before kicking an 18-yard field goal. Late in the half, Los Angeles capitalised on a 19-yard punt, with Agajanian's 27-yard field goal reducing their deficit to 10–9 at halftime.

Houston received the second half kickoff, and Blanda threw another touchdown pass to finish off a 55-yard drive, this time on 3rd and goal from the 7. In their response, the Chargers reached a 3rd and 13 at the Houston 35. Kemp eluded several pursuers while rolling to the right, eventually finding Kocourek 33 yards downfield to keep the drive going. Lowe scored from the next play; the Chargers opted not to try a two point conversion, and trailed 17–16 after a successful extra point. The next four possessions ended in punts, the last of these pinning Houston at their own 11 yard line, early in the final quarter. After two plays gained only a single yard, Blanda threw his third touchdown of the game, finding Billy Cannon in stride at about the 32, with the running back winning a footrace to complete an 88-yard score. The Chargers tried to convert a 4th and 3 at the Houston 35 on their next possession, but Womble was stopped a yard short on a catch from Kemp. On the next drive, Houston reached a 4th and 1 from the 2 before the Charger defense stuffed them for no gain on a running play.

Los Angeles then began their final drive from their own 2. Norton caught a pair of 6-yard passes, before Lowe broke off a 20-yard run around the right end. A 13-yard Kocourek catch moved the ball to the Charger 47, before Kemp was sacked twice for the loss of 12 yards, bring up 3rd and 22. Kemp and Ferguson connected for 13 yards, and Lowe converted on 4th and 9 with another run around the right end, this time for 24 yards, to the Houston 28. A 6-yard pass to Flowers, either side of two incompletions, brought up 4th and 4 from the 22 with a little over a minute remaining. Kemp's last pass, intended for Kocourek, was incomplete, and Houston ran out the clock to clinch the AFL title.

Blanda was 16 of 31 for 301 yards and three touchdowns, each of which came on 3rd down. Kemp was 21 of 41 for 171 yards, with two interceptions. Lowe rushed 21 times for 165 yards and a touchdown.

Notes

References

External links 
 1960 Los Angeles Chargers at Pro-Football-Reference.com 
 1960 Los Angeles Chargers at jt-sw.com
 1960 Los Angeles Chargers at the Football Database (FootballDB.com) 
 1960 Los Angeles Chargers at youtube.com

Los Angeles Chargers
Los Angeles Chargers seasons
Los Angeles Chargers f